Albert  Wagner (September 17, 1871 – November 26, 1928), was an American professional baseball player. He played one year of Major League Baseball for two different teams during the 1898 season. He was Honus Wagner's older brother.

Career
Born in Chartiers, Carnegie, Pennsylvania, he began the 1898 season with the Washington Senators and later on was loaned to the Brooklyn Bridegrooms. On July 4, Wagner replaced an injured Duke Farrell in center field and hit a home run, the only home run of his career, along with a double and scored three runs in a 9-5 Bridegroom victory.

Wagner died in Pittsburgh, Pennsylvania at the age of 57, and is interred at the Chartiers Cemetery in Carnegie, Pennsylvania.

Popular culture
Butts Wagner is depicted as an eccentric inventor during a boy's long dream sequence in Joseph Romain's book The Mystery of the Wagner Whacker. Wagner invents an automatic bat machine, and the boy helps defend him from organized crime figures who want to steal the invention. In Dan Gutman's book Honus & Me, the main character Joe Stoshack prefers to be Butts.

References

External links 

Major League Baseball third basemen
American people of German descent
Washington Senators (1891–1899) players
Brooklyn Bridegrooms players
Warren (minor league baseball) players
Canton Deubers players
Steubenville Stubs players
Akron Akrons players
Lima Farmers players
Toronto Canadians players
Albany Senators players
Wheeling Nailers (baseball) players
Toronto Canucks players
Toronto Maple Leafs (International League) players
Kansas City Blues (baseball) players
Providence Clamdiggers (baseball) players
Providence Grays (minor league) players
Montreal Royals players
Baseball players from Pennsylvania
19th-century baseball players
American expatriate baseball players in Canada
1871 births
1928 deaths
People from Carnegie, Pennsylvania